The Best of Farmer's Daughter is the greatest hits album by Canadian country music group Farmer's Daughter, and was released in 1999 by Universal Music Canada.

Track listing

 "Walkin' in the Sunshine" (Kostas, Jeff Hanna) - 3:45
 "Cornfields or Cadillacs" (Marcus Hummon, Monty Powell, Mike Noble) - 3:33
 "Blue Horizon" (Stan Meissner, Angela Kelman, Jake Leiske, Shauna Rae Samograd) - 3:41
 "Freeway" (Angela Kelman, Jake Leiske, Shauna Rae Samograd) - 4:13
 "You Said" (Beth Nielsen Chapman) - 3:28
 "Borderline Angel" (LuAnn Reid, Tony Rudner) - 4:10
 "Son of a Preacher Man" (John Hurley, Ronnie Wilkins) - 3:34
 "I Wanna Hold You" (Bruce Miller) - 3:54
 "Family Love" (Bruce Miller, Jake Leiske, Shauna Rae Samograd, Angela Kelman) - 3:20
 "Lonely Gypsy Wind" (Greg Barnhill, Jake Leiske, Angela Kelman, Shauna Rae Samograd) - 3:08
 "Callin' All You Cowboys" (Angela Kelman) - 3:43
 "Now That I'm On My Own" (Darrell Scott) - 3:27
 "You and Only You" (Kostas, Wally Wilson) - 3:34

Chart performance

Farmer's Daughter albums
1999 greatest hits albums